Xenia Knoll (born 2 September 1992) is a Swiss tennis player.

Knoll has won two doubles titles on the WTA Tour and one WTA 125 doubles title, as well as four singles and 30 doubles titles on the ITF Circuit. On 23 March 2015, she reached her career-high singles ranking of world No. 254. On  17 April 2017, she peaked at No. 40 in the WTA doubles rankings.

Knoll made her WTA Tour debut at the 2013 Budapest Grand Prix with a direct entry into the main draw, losing in straight sets to the former world-ranked No. 11, Shahar Pe'er of Israel.

Knoll made her debut for the Switzerland Fed Cup team in 2015.

Personal life
She is of Serbian descent on her mother's side who is from Belgrade.

Performance timeline

Doubles

WTA career finals

Doubles: 9 (2 titles, 7 runner-ups)

WTA 125 tournament finals

Doubles: 1 (title)

ITF Circuit finals

Singles: 9 (4 titles, 5 runner–ups)

Doubles: 53 (32 titles, 21 runner–ups)

References

External links

 
 
 
 Official website 

1992 births
Living people
People from Biel/Bienne
Swiss female tennis players
Swiss people of Serbian descent
Sportspeople from the canton of Bern